DeKi 300 may refer to the following:

 Meitetsu DeKi 300, an electric locomotive type operated by Meitetsu in Japan
 Chichibu Railway Class DeKi 300, an electric locomotive type operated by Chichibu Railway in Japan